Stark is an unincorporated community in Fish Lake Township, Chisago County, Minnesota, United States.

Chisago County Roads 8 and 10 are two of the main routes in the community.  Nearby places include Harris, North Branch, Rush Point, and Spring Lake.  Stark is located within ZIP code 55032 based in Harris.

A post office called Stark was established in 1868, and remained in operation until it was discontinued in 1904. Lars Johan Stark, the first postmaster, gave the community its name.

References

Unincorporated communities in Minnesota
Unincorporated communities in Chisago County, Minnesota